Sible and Castle Hedingham railway station was a station in Sible Hedingham, Essex. It closed for passengers in 1962.

References

External links
 Sible and Castle Hedingham station on navigable 1946 O. S. map
 

Disused railway stations in Essex
Former Colne Valley and Halstead Railway stations
Railway stations in Great Britain opened in 1861
Railway stations in Great Britain closed in 1962
1861 establishments in England